The 1977 Missouri Valley Conference men's basketball tournament was held February 28–March 5 at Levitt Arena on the campus of Wichita State University in Wichita, Kansas. This was the initial edition of the conference tournament.

Top-seeded  defeated  in the inaugural championship game, 82–69, to win their first men's basketball tournament.

The Salukis, in turn, received a bid to the 1977 NCAA tournament.

Bracket

References

Missouri Valley Conference men's basketball tournament
1976–77 Missouri Valley Conference men's basketball season
1977 in sports in Kansas